Arambagh Lok Sabha constituency is one of the 543 parliamentary constituencies in India. The constituency centres on Arambagh in West Bengal. While six assembly segments of Arambagh Lok Sabha constituency are in Hooghly district, one segment is in Paschim Medinipur district. The seat was earlier an open seat but from 2009 it was reserved for scheduled castes.

Overview

In the 2004 Lok Sabha polls Anil Basu of CPI(M) won the Arambagh seat by a margin of 592,502 votes, which remained for a long time the highest ever victory margin in Lok Sabha polls in the country. Pritam Munde won the Beed Lok Sabha constituency in 2014 by 6,92,245 votes

Assembly segments
As per order of the Delimitation Commission issued in 2006 in respect of the delimitation of constituencies in the West Bengal, parliamentary constituency no. 29 Arambag, reserved for Scheduled castes (SC), is composed of the following assembly segments:

Prior to delimitation Arambagh Lok Sabha constituency was composed of the following assembly segments: Tarakeswar (assembly constituency no. 185), Pursurah (assembly constituency no. 192), Khanakul (SC) (assembly constituency no. 193), Arambagh (assembly constituency no. 194), Goghat (SC) (assembly constituency no. 195), Chandrakona (assembly constituency no. 196), Ghatal (SC) (assembly constituency no. 197)

Members of Parliament

Election results

General election 2019

General election 2014

General election 2009

General election 2004

General election 1999

General election 1998

General election 1996

General election 1991

General election 1989

General election 1984

General election 1980

General election 1977

General election 1971

General election 1967

General elections 1967-2009
Most of the contests were multi-cornered. However, only winners and runners-up are mentioned below:

See also
 List of Constituencies of the Lok Sabha

References

External links
Arambagh lok sabha  constituency election 2019 result details

Lok Sabha constituencies in West Bengal
Politics of Hooghly district